The Temco Model 33 Plebe was an American two-seat training aircraft built by Temco Aircraft and evaluated by the United States Navy, only a prototype was built.

Design and development
Developed from the earlier Temco Buckaroo, the Plebe was a single-engined low-wing monoplane with a retractable tricycle landing gear. The Plebe was powered by a  Continental O-470-3 piston engine with a two-bladed tractor propeller. The two crew sat in tandem with dual controls under a sliding canopy.

First flown in 1953 the Plebe was evaluated by the United States Navy to meet the requirement for a primary/basic trainer. A contract was placed for the competing Beechcraft Mentor and only the prototype Plebe was built.

Specifications

See also

References
Notes

Plebe
1950s United States military trainer aircraft
Low-wing aircraft
Aircraft first flown in 1953
Single-engined tractor aircraft